Married in Canada is a Canadian documentary about human rights and cross-border same-sex marriage. The documentary is produced and directed by Arianne Robinson, a Toronto-based filmmaker, her first feature-length documentary.

Synopsis
Married in Canada follows seven American couples, 3 gay male and 4 lesbian couples, deciding to benefit from Canadian legalized marriage laws to get married in Toronto, while they are prohibited from doing so in the United States in their resident states. The couples and their families illustrate why overcoming the obstacles to legal nuptials is worthwhile, despite the reality that once back home south of the border, the newlyweds will remain merely 'married in Canada' as their marital status will be unrecognized. The marrying couples also candidly discuss differences in attitude between Americans and Canadians based on their experiences in Canada including human rights, homophobia, openness of society and acceptance of the other. The film also takes an inside view on a Canadian agency catering for cross-border same-sex marriage packages to the United States and other countries.

Screenings
The world premiere of the film was May 9, 2010, during 2010 Spirit Quest Film Festival. It also showed at the DocMiami International Film Festival.
   
Television premiere was on April 30, 2011 on Canadian gay OUTtv network.

See also
 List of LGBT films directed by women

External links

Canadian LGBT-related films
2010 films
2010 documentary films
Documentary films about same-sex marriage
Films shot in Toronto
Canadian documentary films
2010 LGBT-related films
OutTV (Canadian TV channel) original programming
2010s English-language films
2010s Canadian films